Deborah Dir is an American film and stage actress.



Background
Deborah was born in Santa Rosa, California to Italian, Irish-American parents.
She is the niece of legendary singer songwriter, guitarist Brian Marnell SVT (band), known for his innovative Rock New Wave sound with San Francisco, Bay Area SVT (band) with Jack Casady and his collaboration with Jim Carroll, The Basketball Diaries.

Deborah's training first started at The American Academy of Dramatic Arts and went on to audition and successfully achieve a lifetime membership at The Actors Studio. There, she met and studied under acting coach Joanne Linville, a protègè of Stella Adler and one of the founding teachers at the Stella Adler Studio of Acting. Mark Ruffalo and Benicio Del Toro are some of her former students, among others.

Work
In 2001, she made her theatrical debut in Maxim Gorky Summerfolk receiving the Los Angeles critic's choice and garnering several others. Deborah went on to originate the role of Ashley in the world premier of George Furth's Sex, Sex, Sex, Sex, Sex, Sex and Sex directed by John Rubinstein and presented by The Actors Studio. In 2003, she starred in the acclaimed production of LeRoi Jones Dutchman, playing Lula opposite Anthony Montgomery from the Star Trek: Enterprise. In 2007, Deborah starred in John Patrick Shanley Danny and The Deep Blue Sea with Daniel DeWeldon,. Their Los Angeles revival ran for six months with sold-out audiences receiving 12 acclaimed Critic's Choice's including The LA Times. At the 29th annual LA Weekly theater awards, Danny and The Deep Blue Sea was nominated for best two person show and best production design.

Deborah's film credits include The American Connection (2021) Hollyweird (2019) Pig (2011 film) and A Winter Rose (2014) with Taryn Manning. Deborah worked in television Bernie Mac Show, alongside Bernie Mac and Wesley Snipes.

References 

1.^Pig (2011 film)Deborah Dir as Woman 3

2.^LA WeeklyDir]

3.^LA TimesDir]

External link
https://www.imdb.com/name/nm1307886/
http://www.imdb.com/list/ls075036149/
https://theactorsstudio.org/
Official website
The American Academy of Dramatic Arts
Splash Magazine

Year of birth missing (living people)
Living people
Actresses from Santa Rosa, California
American stage actresses
American television actresses
21st-century American women